The Bibliothèque de l'École des Chartes is a journal dedicated to the study and use of medieval manuscripts.  It was founded in 1839 and continues to provide bi-annual issues with articles and abstracts in French, English, and German.  Starting in 1995, one issue each year is devoted to a particular theme.  It is published by the Société de l’École des chartes (Association of the Archive Training School) and distributed by Librairie Droz. As of 2016, the director is Michelle Bubenicek.

Scholars often cite this journal with the abbreviation BEC.  Historical works on the Crusades, for example, often refer to medieval documents as published in the Bibliothèque.

See also
 Victorian societies for text publication
 Bibliothèque des Écoles françaises d'Athènes et de Rome

External links
  Official website
  Persée provides access to back issues from 1961-2007 of the Bibliothèque de l'École des chartes
  Gallica provides access to back issues from 1839-1936

Library science journals
Medieval literature
Publications established in 1839
History journals